Baira Kovanova (born May 12, 1987) is a Russian chess player, and a woman grandmaster.

She made it to the second round of the Women's World Chess Championship 2010.

She also came 17th in the FIDE Women's Grand Prix 2009–11.

References

External links 
Her games

Living people
1987 births
Chess woman grandmasters
Place of birth missing (living people)
Russian female chess players